Sam Lamb (5 July 1879–1960) was an English footballer who played in the Football League for Derby County and Rotherham County.

References

19th-century births
1960 deaths
English footballers
Association football forwards
English Football League players
Alfreton Town F.C. players
Derby County F.C. players
Sutton Town A.F.C. players
Plymouth Argyle F.C. players
Swindon Town F.C. players
Millwall F.C. players
Rotherham County F.C. players
Caerphilly F.C. players